The 2013 Weber State Wildcats football team represented Weber State University in the 2013 NCAA Division I FCS football season. Jody Sears returned as the head coach for the 2013 season, after being the interim head coach during 2012, and will be working with a new offensive coordinator and defensive coordinator in Robin Pflugrad and Eric Lewis. Weber State played their home games at Stewart Stadium. They were a member of the Big Sky Conference. They finished the season 2–10, 1–7 in Big Sky play to finish in a tie for 11th place.

On November 26, head coach Jody Sears was fired after a two-season record of 4–19. It was part of Sears' three-year contract, signed after his first year as interim head coach, that he could be fired without compensation if the Wildcats failed to win four games in a season.

Roster

Media
All Wildcats games can be heard on KLO (Ogden) and KLO-FM (Salt Lake City), nicknamed KLO AM/FM. KLO is a move from the previous radio broadcast group of 1280 AM, but radio broadcasts will still be done online via Big Sky TV for non-televised home games and on KLOradio.com for all games. Carl Arky and Ty Sparrow will call every game.

Schedule

Game summaries

Stephen F. Austin

Sources:

Utah

Sources:

Utah State

Sources:

McNeese State

Sources:

Sacramento State

Sources:

Eastern Washington

Sources:

Cal Poly

Sources:

Montana State

Sources:

Portland State

Sources:

Southern Utah

Sources:

Montana

Sources:

Idaho State

Sources:

References

Weber State
Weber State Wildcats football seasons
Weber State Wildcats football